The 1948–49 Israel Youth State Cup (Gvia HaMedina) was the first season of Israeli Football Association's nationwide football cup competition for youth footballers. 

14 teams registered to play for the cup and the competition began of 30 October 1948. In the final, played at Hapoel Tel Aviv's Basa Stadium, Maccabi Avraham Tel Aviv defeated Maccabi Ramat Gan 3–0.

Results

First round

Quarter-finals
As 7 clubs progressed to the quarter-finals, one club, Maccabi Ramat Gan received a bye to the semi-finals. The quarter-finals were played on 19 November 1948.

Semi-finals
Due to weather conditions, the semi-final matches were delayed until 8 January 1949. Both matches were played at Basa Stadium.

Final

Notes

References 
 100 Years of Football 1906-2006, Elisha Shohat (Israel), 2006

External links 
 1948-1949 Youth State Cup  David Ovich, 1 September 2012, Football in Israel, israblog.co.il 

Israel Youth State Cup seasons
Israel Youth State Cup
State Youth Cup